XHEPT-FM is a radio station on 99.1 FM in Misantla, Veracruz, known as Ke Buena.

History
XEPT-AM 1590 received its concession on October 31, 1964. It was owned by Hilario Ávila Serrano and broadcast with 1,000 watts day and 100 watts night.

XEPT moved to FM in 2012 as XHEPT-FM 99.1.

References

Radio stations in Veracruz
Radio stations established in 1964